Dobrača  is a village located in the city of Kragujevac, Serbia. According to the 2011 census, the village has a population of 425 inhabitants.

References

Populated places in Šumadija District